Events from the year 2021 in Saint Lucia

Incumbents
 Monarch: Elizabeth II
 Governor-General: Neville Cenac (until 31 October); Errol Charles onwards
 Prime Minister: Allen Chastanet (until 28 July); Philip J. Pierre onwards

Events
Ongoing — COVID-19 pandemic in Saint Lucia

 4 July – Tropical Storm Elsa passes through the Caribbean, downing trees and blowing off roofs, killing two people in the Dominican Republic and one in Saint Lucia.
 26 July – 2021 Saint Lucian general election: The opposition Saint Lucia Labour Party, which won 13 of the 17 seats in the House, while the ruling United Workers Party lost nine of its eleven seats.
 28 July – Philip J. Pierre is sworn in as the new Prime Minister.

References

 
Years of the 21st century in Saint Lucia
Saint Lucia
Saint Lucia
2020s in Saint Lucia